Taltheilei may refer to:

 Taltheilei Narrows Airport
 Taltheilei Narrows Water Aerodrome
 Taltheilei Shale tradition, the name given to the culture and people of the late prehistoric western subarctic culture, dated between 750 BC and AD 1000.